Milutin Dragićević (born 21 April 1983) is a Serbian handball player for Mačva Bogatić.

Career
Born in Šabac, Dragićević started out at his hometown club Metaloplastika. He later moved abroad and played for HCM Constanța (on two occasions), Bjerringbro-Silkeborg and THW Kiel. While playing for the German side, Dragićević was a member of the team that won the 2011–12 EHF Champions League. He returned to his mother club Metaloplastika ahead of the 2014–15 season, signing a three-year contract.

At international level, Dragićević was capped for Serbia, but failed to appear in any major tournaments.

Honours
HCM Constanța
 Liga Națională: 2005–06, 2006–07, 2012–13
 Cupa României: 2005–06, 2012–13
THW Kiel
 Handball-Bundesliga: 2011–12
 DHB-Pokal: 2010–11, 2011–12
 DHB-Supercup: 2011
 EHF Champions League: 2011–12
 IHF Super Globe: 2011

References

External links

 EHF record

1983 births
Living people
Sportspeople from Šabac
Serbian male handball players
RK Metaloplastika players
THW Kiel players
Handball-Bundesliga players
Expatriate handball players
Serbian expatriate sportspeople in Romania
Serbian expatriate sportspeople in Denmark
Serbian expatriate sportspeople in Germany